Soham is a given name which may refer to:

 Soham Chakrabarty, 21st century Indian playback singer
 Soham Chakraborty (born 1984), Indian actor, producer, television personality and politician
 Soham Ghosh (born 1986), Indian former cricketer
 Soham Shah, 21st century Bollywood movie director
 Soham Swami (1858–1918), Hindu guru and yogi and lion tamer
 Soham El Wardini (born 1953), Senegalese politician and mayor of Dakar, Senegal

See also
 Soham (disambiguation)

Indian masculine given names